Gadoversetamide is a gadolinium-based MRI contrast agent, particularly for imaging of the brain, spine and liver. It is marketed under the trade name OptiMARK.

Notes

Organogadolinium compounds
MRI contrast agents